Rafał Skarbek-Malczewski (born 7 October 1982) is a Polish snowboarder. He competed in the men's snowboard cross event at the 2006 Winter Olympics.

References

1982 births
Living people
Polish male snowboarders
Olympic snowboarders of Poland
Snowboarders at the 2006 Winter Olympics
People from Cieszyn